Chung Eun-soon (born 18 July 1971) is a Korean former basketball player who competed in the 1996 Summer Olympics and in the 2000 Summer Olympics.

References

1971 births
Living people
South Korean women's basketball players
Olympic basketball players of South Korea
Basketball players at the 1996 Summer Olympics
Basketball players at the 2000 Summer Olympics
Yong In University alumni
Asian Games medalists in basketball
Basketball players at the 1990 Asian Games
Basketball players at the 1994 Asian Games
Asian Games gold medalists for South Korea

Medalists at the 1990 Asian Games
Medalists at the 1994 Asian Games